RS-56812 is a potent and selective partial agonist at the 5HT3 receptor. It has been shown to improve performance on animal tests of memory. Its use in humans is not well documented.

References 

Serotonin receptor agonists
Tryptamines
Acetamides
Quinuclidines
5-HT3 agonists